Əhən (also, Agan and Akhan) is a village and municipality in the Ismailli Rayon of Azerbaijan.  It has a population of 573.  The municipality consists of the villages of Əhən, Duvaryan, and Ximran.

References 

Populated places in Ismayilli District